This is a list of United States Marine Corps Aviation Groups (MAG, MACG, MATSG).  Inactive groups are listed by their designation at the time they were decommissioned.

Active Marine Aircraft Groups (MAG)

MAGs consist of a MAG headquarters, a Marine Aviation Logistic Squadron (MALS), a Marine Wing Support Squadron (MWSS), and from two to ten aircraft squadrons and/or detachments (HMH, HMHT, HMLA, HMLAT, VMM, VMMT, VMA, VMAT, VMFA, VMFA (AW), VMFT, VMGR, VMU).  The MAG number is derived from the original Marine Aircraft Wing (MAW) where the MAG was activated (e.g. MAG 11 was the first MAG activated under 1st MAW and MAG 26 was 6th MAG activated under 2d MAW.) The exceptions to the MAG numbering sequence are the no longer active Marine Wing Support Groups (MWSG) which ended with the number 7 (i e. MWSG 17, 27, 37 & 47) and still active Marine Air Control Groups which end with 8 (I.e. 18, 28, 38 & 48).

Active Marine Air Control Groups (MACG)

Consists of a MACG headquarters and a Marine Air Control Squadron (MACS), a Marine Air Support Squadron (MASS), a Marine Tactical Air Command Squadron (MTACS), a Marine Wing Communications Squadron (MWCS), and a Low Altitude Air Defense (LAAD) Battery/Detachment.

Active Marine Training Support Groups (MATSG)

Performs administrative control and training support for Marine Corps personnel assigned as either permanent party or as students undergoing formal naval aviation training programs. The group also provides Marines for ceremonial support and as special detail advisors.

Decommissioned Marine Aircraft Groups

See also

 List of United States Marine Corps aircraft wings
 List of United States Marine Corps aircraft squadrons
 List of United States Marine Corps aviation support squadrons
 Carrier air wing

Notes

References
Bibliography

 
 

Web

 9th MAW Unit History

Aircraft groups

Marine Corps aircraft groups